Rock Spring Farm is a historic home located at Leesburg, Loudoun County, Virginia.  The original section of the house was built about 1826, with wing and one-story addition built about 1906, and hyphen in 1980 to connect to the original brick kitchen.  It consists of a -story, four bay, brick main block in the Federal style with a two-story rear ell and flanking wings. The house was updated near the turn of the 20th century with Colonial Revival style details.  Also on the property are a contributing spring house, smokehouse, barn, dairy, silo, tractor shed, and stable.

It was listed on the National Register of Historic Places in 2002.

References

Houses on the National Register of Historic Places in Virginia
Federal architecture in Virginia
Colonial Revival architecture in Virginia
Houses completed in 1826
Houses in Loudoun County, Virginia
National Register of Historic Places in Loudoun County, Virginia
1826 establishments in Virginia
Leesburg, Virginia